Pet School is a children's series for CBBC that began airing on 3 December 2012. It was hosted by Aaron Craze for the first series and Luke Franks for the second.

SERIES 1:
Pet Heads:       
Chris,                 
Giulia, 
Liam,
Micah,
Rachel,
Sam,
Sophie,
Tej,
Ysabel.

SERIES 2:
Pet Heads:     
Ananya,
Chloe,
Courtney,
Faramarz,
Lauren,
Sam,
Tommy,
Thomas,
William.

Transmission

External links
 

2010s British children's television series
2012 British television series debuts
2012 in British television
BBC Television shows
English-language television shows